The 2003 Malé League was the third season of the Malé League.

League table

References
 Maldives 2003, Malé League at RSSSF

Football leagues in the Maldives
Maldives
Maldives
1